Frank Anderson (21 November 1889 – 25 April 1959) was a Labour Party politician in the United Kingdom.

Born in Bury, Anderson became a railway clerk.  He joined the Labour Party, and stood unsuccessfully in High Peak at the 1922 and 1923 United Kingdom general elections, and in Stretford at the 1929 and 1931 United Kingdom general elections.  He was finally elected in Whitehaven in 1935, serving until his death, aged 69, in 1959.

References

External links 

Biography
Speeches

1889 births
1959 deaths
Labour Party (UK) MPs for English constituencies
Transport Salaried Staffs' Association-sponsored MPs
UK MPs 1935–1945
UK MPs 1945–1950
UK MPs 1950–1951
UK MPs 1951–1955
UK MPs 1955–1959